= Ambivali Tarf Tungaratan =

- town
- Location in Maharashtra, India
- Coordinates: 18.8915°N 73.1775°E
- Country: India
- State: Maharashtra
- District: Raigad

Population (2001)
  - Total: 6,799

Languages
  - Official: Marathi
- Time zone: UTC+5:30 (IST)
- Postal code: 410207
- Vehicle registration: MH46

Ambivali Tarf Tungaratan is a census town in Raigad district in the state of Maharashtra, India.

== Demographics ==
As of 2001 India census, Ambivali Tarf Tungaratan had a population of 6796. Males constitute 55% of the population and females 45%. Ambivali Tarf Tungaratan has an average literacy rate of 73%, higher than the national average of 59.5%; with 59% of the males and 41% of females literate. 15% of the population is under 6 years of age.
